Lisa Sophie Gericke (born 17 March 1995) is a German bobsledder.

She participated at the IBSF World Championships 2019, winning a medal.

References

External links

1995 births
Living people
German female bobsledders
Sportspeople from Brandenburg an der Havel
21st-century German women